Caladenia incrassata, commonly known as the puppet clown orchid is a species of orchid endemic to the south-west of Western Australia. It has a single, hairy leaf and usually only one greenish-yellow and red flower which has a red-striped labellum.

Description
All three sepals have thickened, club-like pinkish to yellowish glandular tips. Flowering occurs from August to September.

Taxonomy and naming
Caladenia incrassata was first described in 2001 by Stephen Hopper and Andrew Phillip Brown from a specimen collected on Muddarning Hill north of Koolyanobbing and the description was published in Nuytsia. The specific epithet (incrassata) is a Latin word meaning "thickened" referring to the thicked sepals of this species. (The dorsal sepal of the similar Caladenia brevisura is not thickened and the lateral sepals are less so.)

Distribution and habitat
The puppet clown orchid occurs between Paynes Find and Southern Cross in the Avon Wheatbelt, Coolgardie, Murchison and Yalgoo biogeographic regions where it grows under shrubs on granite outcrops and on ironstone hills.

Conservation
Caladenia incrassata  is classified as "not threatened" by the Western Australian Government Department of Parks and Wildlife.

References

incrassata
Orchids of Western Australia
Endemic orchids of Australia
Plants described in 2001
Endemic flora of Western Australia
Taxa named by Stephen Hopper
Taxa named by Andrew Phillip Brown